Figtree High School is a government-funded co-educational comprehensive secondary day school, located on Gibsons Road in Figtree, a suburb of Wollongong, in the Illawarra region of New South Wales, Australia.

Established in 1969, the school enrolled approximately 900 students in 2018, from Year 7 to Year 12, of whom five percent identified as Indigenous Australians and 26 percent were from a language background other than English. The school is operated by the New South Wales Department of Education.

History
Figtree High School was established in 1969, with 242 First Form students enrolling as the first students to attend. The first principal of the school was Ken Brokenshire, with Robert Everitt, the Deputy Principal and nine assistant teachers. Because construction of the school was not finished at the time, students and teachers borrowed furniture from Dapto High School and attended classes in seven portable buildings in the grounds of Dapto High School. Construction finally finished in July 1969, being announced "Australia's most modern high school" by the local newspaper, and students re-located back to their new building in Gibsons Road. Of the original 242 students enrolled in 1969, 87 elected to enter the Senior School and completed their Higher School Certificate in 1974.

The school was built in close proximity to the famous, historic fig tree that the suburb was named after, and this tree was adopted as the school emblem. But in 1987, after a significant storm, the tree was terminally damaged and was removed as a safety precaution. Students referred to the school as "Figstump High" for this time. After much discussion, a new fig tree was planted on the site of the original tree in 1997.

Staff
The current principal of Figtree High School is Daniel Ovens. There are 52 classroom teachers and a total of approximately 100 staff members including behaviour teachers, physical disability teachers and school assistants.

Music, dance and drama 
Figtree High School has put on a number of musical productions including the 2008 production of "The Course of True Love", written by a teacher at the school and the 2010 production of "Grease: The Musical".

Notable alumni

 Jan Barhampolitician; former MLC - Greens Member NSW Legislative Council
 Stephen Blackformer professional NBL basketball player
 David Farmeradministrator; former General Manager Wollongong City Council, now CEO Ipswich City Council
 Brian Hetheringtonformer professional rugby league footballer, state representative
 Garry Jackformer professional rugby league footballer, national representative
 Phil Jaquesformer Australian cricketer
 Wendy Laidlawbasketball player; represented Australia at the 1984 Olympics and the 1983 World Championships
 Ashley Paskeformer actor in Neighbours now voiceover professional
 Steve Roachformer professional rugby league footballer, national representative
 Jason Rylesformer professional rugby league footballer, national representative
 Carolyn Watsonconductor

See also 

 List of government schools in New South Wales
 List of schools in Illawarra and the South East (New South Wales)
 Education in Australia

References

External links 
 Figtree High School website

Public high schools in New South Wales
Educational institutions established in 1969
Schools in Wollongong
1969 establishments in Australia